Shirome (白女) was a minor female Japanese waka poet, who lived during the 10th century AD.

She was born in Eguchi, Settsu Province (摂津国江口, modern day Osaka) and thought to be a daughter of a minor aristocrat Settsunokuni Tamabuchi (摂津国玉淵). Her occupation was an asobi/yujo (遊女), which later in history meant a common prostitute however during Heian period (794-1185) it often referred to a woman who was trained in the art of singing and dancing - similar to the latter day Geisha. Her performance in front of an abdicated emperor is recorded in a book Okagami (大鏡), The Great Mirror, and other sources.

A poem of hers was included in the Kokin Wakashū:

If I were only sure
I could live as long as I wanted to,
I would not have to weep
at parting from you.

命だに心にかなふ物ならばなにか別れの悲しからまし

References
 Kenneth Rexroth, Ikuko Atsumi, Woman poets of Japan, 1977, pgs. 19 & 142 ; previously published as The Burning Heart by The Seabury Press.
"Shadows of Transgression: Heian and Kamakura Constructions of Prostitution" by Janet R. Goodwin. Monumenta Nipponica, Vol. 55, No. 3 (Autumn, 2000), pp. 327–368

External links
https://web.archive.org/web/20070928002346/http://www.earlywomenmasters.net/masters/poets/bibliography.html
http://www.asahi-net.or.jp/~sg2h-ymst/yamatouta/sennin/sirome.html

Japanese women poets
10th-century Japanese women writers
10th-century writers